Jason Isaac Fuchs (born March 5, 1986) is an American actor and screenwriter, best known for writing Ice Age: Continental Drift (2012), Pan (2015) and Wonder Woman (2017). He is also known for his role as Lawrence Grey on the Fox dramatic thriller The Passage. In January 2015, Fuchs was included on the Forbes 30 Under 30 list. As a writer, his films have grossed over $1.85 billion at the global box office, making him one of the 100 highest grossing screenwriters of all time.

Early life 
Fuchs was born in New York City, to a Jewish family (of Hasidic background on his father's side). He went on to enroll and graduate from Columbia University in 2009 as a film studies major.

Career 
Fuchs has been acting since he was seven years old, making his debut at Lincoln Center in the play Abe Lincoln in Illinois with Sam Waterston. Fuchs has also guest-starred on Cosby, The Sopranos, The Beat, Law & Order: Criminal Intent, Law & Order: Special Victims Unit, Ed, and All My Children. His first feature film role was as Marvin in the 1996 movie Flipper, co-starring Elijah Wood. In 1998 he appeared in two movies, Louis & Frank and Jane Austen's Mafia!. Fuchs also starred in 2003 film The Hebrew Hammer, co-starring Adam Goldberg.

In 2004, Fuchs took the role in Winter Solstice. Fuchs wrote, produced and starred in the 2006 short film Pitch, which made its premiere at the 2006 Cannes Film Festival. He next appeared in Holy Rollers, a movie inspired by actual events in the late nineties when Hasidic Jews were recruited as mules to smuggle ecstasy from Europe into the United States. He played a brother of Justin Bartha's character, alongside Jesse Eisenberg and Ari Graynor.

In 2012, Fuchs' original TV movie musical, Rags, was broadcast on Nickelodeon. The film, which Fuchs co-wrote with Hillary Galanoy & Elizabeth Hackett with Billie Woodruff directing, was a revisionist take on the Cinderella tale, starring Keke Palmer and Max Schneider. The film received 3.5 million live viewers.

Later that year, Fuchs made his feature screenwriting debut with the animated sequel Ice Age: Continental Drift. Despite receiving generally mixed reviews from critics, the film grossed $877 million at the box office, making it the fifth highest-grossing film of 2012, and the highest-grossing animated film internationally to that point.

His script Pan was listed on Hollywood's 2013 Black List, and was made into a 2015 film, which was a critical and box office failure.

Fuchs co-wrote the 2017 film Wonder Woman with Zack Snyder and Allan Heinberg. In 2016, Warner Bros. hired Fuchs to write the script for a Lobo feature film, and a film adaptation of the video game Minecraft. Fuchs stopped working on the script for the Minecraft film in August 2018.

In 2019, Fuchs was featured in a major recurring role as Lawrence Grey on the Fox series The Passage.

In November 2022, it was announced that Fuchs was one of the showrunners of Welcome to Derry, an upcoming prequel series to the horror films It and It Chapter Two.

Awards and nominations
2018: Satellite Award for Best Adapted Screenplay for Wonder Woman (Nominated)
2018: USC Scripter Award for Best Adapted Screenplay for Wonder Woman (Nominated)
2018: Saturn Award for Best Film Screenplay for Wonder Woman (Nominated)
2018: Hugo Award for Best Dramatic Presentation - Long Form for Wonder Woman (Won)

Filmography

Film

As screenwriter

Television

Video games

References

External links

1986 births
American male film actors
American male television actors
American male video game actors
Jewish American male actors
Living people
Male actors from New York City
Columbia College (New York) alumni
21st-century American Jews
Hugo Award-winning writers